The 1976 Lucas Industries Men's World Open Squash Championship was the inaugural men's edition of the 1976 World Open, which serves as the individual world championship for squash players. The event took place in London in England from 31 January to 7 February 1976. Geoff Hunt won his first World Open title, defeating Mohibullah Khan in the final.
The championship of 1976 also served as the British Open for that year.

Seeds

Draw and results

Section 1

Section 2

Section 3

Section 4

Semi-finals & Final

Notes
This was the inaugural World Open that doubled up as the British Open.Held at Wembley a record prize fund of £10,000 was put forward for this first professional World Open.

See also
PSA World Open

References

External links
World Squash History

World Squash Championships
Men's World Open Championship
Men's World Open Squash Championship
Men's World Open Squash Championship
International sports competitions in London
Squash competitions in London
Squash tournaments in the United Kingdom